Tan Yayun (谭亚运; born 18 November 1992) is a Chinese weighlifter. She competed at the 2013 World Championships in the Women's 48 kg, winning the gold medal. She also won Gold in the 2014 World Weightlifting Championships in Almaty.

References

Chinese female weightlifters
1992 births
Living people
World Weightlifting Championships medalists
20th-century Chinese women
21st-century Chinese women